Matthew Manfield (born 14 April 1977) is a former Australian rules footballer who played with Fitzroy and Richmond in the Australian Football League (AFL).

Recruited to the AFL from the Woodville-West Torrens Football Club, Manfield was selected by Fitzroy with the 24th pick of the 1994 National Draft. He made his debut in the opening round of the 1995 AFL season, against Essendon at Western Oval, but did not feature again that year.

After playing four games in 1996, Manfield entered into the draft again and was signed up by Richmond. He played two games for Richmond in 1997 and another four in 1998.

In 1999 he joined Collingwood but would not play a senior AFL games for the club.

He later played at Glenelg and while with the club in 2003 was diagnosed with testicular cancer. He successfully went through surgery and radiotherapy and he is now the father of twins.

References

1977 births
Australian rules footballers from South Australia
Fitzroy Football Club players
Richmond Football Club players
Woodville-West Torrens Football Club players
Glenelg Football Club players
Living people